The 1906 NYU Violets football team was an American football team that represented New York University as an independent during the 1906 college football season. In their only year under head coach Douglas Church, the team compiled a 0–4 record.

Schedule

References

NYU
NYU Violets football seasons
College football winless seasons
NYU Violets football